Major Wright (born July 1, 1988) is a former American football safety. He played college football for the University of Florida, and was a member of a BCS National Championship team. He was drafted by the Chicago Bears in the third round of the 2010 NFL Draft.

Early years
Wright was born in Lauderdale Lakes, Florida.  He attended St. Thomas Aquinas High School in Ft. Lauderdale, Florida, where he played high school football for the St. Thomas Aquinas Raiders and ran track.  As a junior, he recorded 58 tackles with six interceptions and as a sophomore had 71 tackles and 10 interceptions.  As a senior, he was a finalist for the Hall Trophy (U.S. Army Player of the Year Award) after he recorded 72 tackles and three interceptions.  He played in the 2007 U.S. Army All-American Bowl.  Wright was an All-state selection both years. In track & field, Wright posted personal-bests of 11.1 in the 100-meter dash, 22.8 in the 200-meter dash and 41.32 in the 4×100-meter relay.

College career
Wright accepted an athletic scholarship to attend the University of Florida in Gainesville, Florida, where he played for coach Urban Meyer's Florida Gators football team from 2007 to 2009.  As a freshman in 2007, Wright started seven of 13 games for the Gators at free safety, recording 67 tackles, four forced fumbles and an interception.  He was a first-team freshman All-American by CollegeFootballNews.com and second-team freshman All-American by Rivals.com.  As a sophomore in 2008, Wright started all 14 games at free safety, recording 66 tackles and four interceptions, with one returned for a touchdown.  He had nine tackles and an interception in the Gators win over the Oklahoma Sooners in the 2009 BCS National Championship Game.

After his junior season, Wright decided to forgo his senior year and enter the NFL Draft.

Professional career

Chicago Bears
The Chicago Bears selected Wright in the third round (75th overall pick) of the 2010 NFL Draft, and was predicted to be a future starter by former Bears general manager Jerry Angelo. During his rookie season, Wright played in eleven of sixteen regular season games. He recorded his first career interception in 2011 off a Michael Vick pass against the Philadelphia Eagles, when a pass by Vick squirted through linebacker Lance Briggs's hands into Wright, who was able to return the ball 39 yards. A week later against the Detroit Lions, Wright intercepted a Matthew Stafford lob and returned it 24 yards for a touchdown, which was the first pick-six of his career. 

In the 2012 season Wright started all 16 games for the Bears at Strong Safety, recording four interceptions along with 52 tackles for the year. During the Week 3 match up against the St. Louis Rams he returned an interception 45 yards for a defensive touchdown.

Tampa Bay Buccaneers
On April 4, 2014, Wright agreed to a one-year contract with the Tampa Bay Buccaneers, reuniting with his former Bears head coach Lovie Smith.  Wright was cut by the Buccaneers on August 30, 2014. Wright rejoined the team on September 3, 2014.

Wright re-signed with the Buccaneers on March 7, 2015. On December 30, 2015, Wright was placed on injured reserve.

On August 28, 2016, Wright was waived by the Buccaneers. He was re-signed by the Buccaneers on November 29, 2016. He was released again on December 13, 2016.

NFL statistics

Subsequent activities

On May 8, 2020, Wright announced the his first book called Major Pain: Confessions Of A Smash-Mouth Safety.

See also

 List of Chicago Bears players
 List of Florida Gators in the NFL Draft

References

External links
 Tampa Bay Buccaneers bio
 Chicago Bears bio
 Florida Gators bio

1988 births
Living people
American football safeties
Chicago Bears players
Florida Gators football players
People from Lauderdale Lakes, Florida
Players of American football from Florida
Sportspeople from Broward County, Florida
Wright, Major
Tampa Bay Buccaneers players